Krzysztof Wiesiołowski (died 1637) was a Polish nobleman, starost of Tykocin and Supraśl, Stolnik of Lithuania and Ciwun of Wilno before 1620, Court Marshal of Lithuania from 1619, Krajczy of Lithuania from 1620, and Grand Marshal of Lithuania from 1635.

He was Marshal of the Sejm from 15 January to 26 February 1609 and 13 February to 13 March 1618 in Warsaw.

Coat of arms

Bibliography
 http://edukacja.sejm.gov.pl/historia-sejmu/marszalkowie-sejmu/i-rzeczpospolita.html
 Ks. A. Kochański, 526 lat dziejów miasta Tykocina na tle historii Polski, Białystok 2010

1637 deaths
17th-century Polish nobility
People from Tykocin
Year of birth unknown
Krzysztof
Grand Marshals of the Grand Duchy of Lithuania
Court Marshals of the Grand Duchy of Lithuania